Freedom to the Slave Makers is Israeli groove metal band Betzefer's second full-length studio album, it was released on February 18, 2011, after it was delayed a few times between 2008–2010. The album is a follow-up to the band's major label debut Down Low from 2005, though it was released on AFM Records.

It was confirmed on the band's Myspace, early before the recording, that the album would be produced by Down producer Warren Riker and that it would include 10 tracks.

The album was delayed several times from a July 2008 release date to September 2008, and then to an unspecified date in 2009, after which it was announced it will be delayed again until 2010. On November 3, 2010, it was finally announced that the band has signed a new record deal with AFM Records, who will release the release worldwide in February 2011. On January 5, 2011, it was confirmed that the album would be released worldwide on February 18, 2011, with a special release show in Tel Aviv, Israel, to follow on March 3, 2011. On January 6, 2011, the band revealed the album's artwork and track list. On January 10, 2011, it was announced that the album would be released in the US on February 22, 2011, through E1 Music.

The album was mastered between May 18–25, 2009, at West West Side Music Studios, in New Windsor, New York by Alan Douches, who previously worked with such bands as Through the Eyes of the Dead, Beneath the Massacre and A Life Once Lost.

On January 20, 2011, the first single from the album, "Nothing But Opinions", was released for free listening through such Israeli sites as Walla!, Nana 10 and Musicspot.

On February 16, 2011, the album was uploaded for free streaming on the band's Facebook and Myspace pages.

Track listing

Personnel
Avital Tamir - lead vocals
Matan Cohen - guitars
Rotem Inbar - bass
Roey Berman - drums, percussion

Production
Warren Riker - production, mixing
Alan Douches - mastering

Release history

References

2011 albums
Betzefer albums
AFM Records albums